Communauté d'agglomération Privas Centre Ardèche is the communauté d'agglomération, an intercommunal structure, centred on the town of Privas. It is located in the Ardèche department, in the Auvergne-Rhône-Alpes region, southern France. Created in 2017, its seat is in Privas. Its area is 602.1 km2. Its population was 43,792 in 2019, of which 8,465 in Privas proper.

Composition
The communauté d'agglomération consists of the following 42 communes:

Ajoux
Alissas
Beauchastel
Beauvène
Chalencon
Châteauneuf-de-Vernoux
Chomérac
Coux
Creysseilles
Dunière-sur-Eyrieux
Flaviac
Freyssenet
Gilhac-et-Bruzac
Gluiras
Gourdon
Lyas
Marcols-les-Eaux
Les Ollières-sur-Eyrieux
Pourchères
Le Pouzin
Pranles
Privas
Rochessauve
Rompon
Saint-Apollinaire-de-Rias
Saint-Cierge-la-Serre
Saint-Étienne-de-Serre
Saint-Fortunat-sur-Eyrieux
Saint-Jean-Chambre
Saint-Julien-du-Gua
Saint-Julien-en-Saint-Alban
Saint-Julien-le-Roux
Saint-Laurent-du-Pape
Saint-Maurice-en-Chalencon
Saint-Michel-de-Chabrillanoux
Saint-Priest
Saint-Sauveur-de-Montagut
Saint-Vincent-de-Durfort
Silhac
Vernoux-en-Vivarais
Veyras
La Voulte-sur-Rhône

References

Privas
Privas